ACM SIGGRAPH is the international Association for Computing Machinery's Special Interest Group on Computer Graphics and Interactive Techniques based in New York. It was founded in 1969 by Andy van Dam (its direct predecessor, ACM SICGRAPH was founded two years earlier in 1967).

ACM SIGGRAPH convenes the annual SIGGRAPH conference, attended by tens of thousands of computer professionals. The organization also sponsors other conferences around the world, and regular events are held by its professional and student chapters in several countries.

Committees

Professional and Student Chapters Committee 
The Professional and Student Chapters Committee (PSCC) is the leadership group that oversees the activities of ACM SIGGRAPH Chapters around the world. Details about Local Chapters can be found below.

International Resources Committee 
The International Resources Committee (IRC) facilitates throughout the year worldwide collaboration in the ACM SIGGRAPH community, provides an English review service to help submitters whose first language is not English, and encourages participation in all SIGGRAPH  conference venues, activities, and events.

Awards
ACM SIGGRAPH presents six awards to recognize achievement in computer graphics. The awards are presented at the annual SIGGRAPH conference.

Steven A. Coons Award
The Steven Anson Coons Award for Outstanding Creative Contributions to Computer Graphics is considered the highest award in computer graphics, and is presented each odd-numbered year to individuals who have made a lifetime contribution to computer graphics. It is named for Steven Anson Coons, an early pioneer in interactive computer graphics.

Recipients:

Computer Graphics Achievement Award
The Computer Graphics Achievement award is given each year to recognize individuals for an outstanding achievement in computer graphics and interactive techniques that provided a significant advance in the state of the art of computer graphics and is still significant and apparent.

Recipients:

Significant New Researcher Award
The Significant New Researcher Award is given annually to a researcher with a recent significant contribution to computer graphics.

Recipients:

Distinguished Artist Award
The Distinguished Artist Award is presented annually to an artist who has created a significant body of digital art work that has advanced the aesthetic content of the medium.

Recipients:

Professional and Student Chapters 
Within their local areas, Chapters continue the work of ACM SIGGRAPH on a year-round basis via their meetings and other activities. Each ACM SIGGRAPH Professional and Student Chapter consists of individuals involved in education, research & development, the arts, industry and entertainment. ACM SIGGRAPH Chapter members are interested in the advancement of computer graphics and interactive techniques, its related technologies and applications. For the annual conference, some of the Chapters produce a "Fast Forward" overview of activities.

Listed below are some examples of Chapter activities:
 MetroCAF is the annual NYC Metropolitan Area College Computer Animation Festival, organized by the New York City chapter of ACM SIGGRAPH.
 Bogota ACM SIGGRAPH has become one of the largest Animation and VFX events in Latin America, counting more than 6,000 registered attendees in 2015’s edition.
 ACM SIGGRAPH Helsinki runs an evening-long graphics conference called SyysGraph, which is held autumn every year. The seminar strives to bring the latest updates of the 3D graphics field, demos, animations and interactive technologies. The presentations are held in English.
 Silicon Valley ACM SIGGRAPH held "Star Wars: The Force Awakens" Visual Effects Panel with Industrial Light & Magic.

See also
 Association for Computing Machinery
 ACM Transactions on Graphics
 Computer Graphics, its defunct quarterly periodical publication.
 SIGGRAPH Conferences

References

External links
Official website

1969 establishments in New York (state)
Computer-related introductions in 1969
Organizations established in 1969
Association for Computing Machinery Special Interest Groups
Computer graphics organizations